Sam Leith (born 1 January 1974) is an English author, journalist and literary editor of The Spectator.

After an education at Eton and Magdalen College, Oxford, Leith worked at the revived satirical magazine Punch, before moving to the Daily Mail and The Daily Telegraph, where he served as literary editor until 2008. He now writes for several publications, including the Financial Times, Prospect, The Spectator, The Wall Street Journal Europe and The Guardian. He had a regular column in the Monday London  Evening Standard. and appeared as a panellist on BBC Two's The Review Show.

Leith has published several works of non-fiction, including Dead Pets, Sod's Law, You Talkin' to Me? and a book of  poetry entitled Our Times in Rhymes: A Prosodical Chronicle of Our Damnable Age The Coincidence Engine, his first novel, was published in April 2011. Leith succeeded Mark Amory as literary editor of The Spectator in September 2014 and was a judge on the panel of the 2015 Man Booker Prize, won by Marlon James with A Brief History of Seven Killings. In November 2016, Leith was named the winner of the Columnist of the Year award at The Editorial Intelligence Comment Awards.

Published books 
 Dead Pets: Eat Them, Stuff Them, Love Them (Canongate, 2005)
 Daddy, Is Timmy in Heaven Now? (Canongate, 2006)
 Sod's Law: Why Life Always Falls Butter Side Down (Atlantic, 2009)
 The Coincidence Engine (Bloomsbury, 2011)
 You Talkin' to Me?: Rhetoric from Aristotle to Obama (Profile Books, 2011)
 Words Like Loaded Pistols: Rhetoric from Aristotle to Obama (Basic Books, 2012) – US edition
 Write to the Point: How To Be Clear, Correct and Persuasive on the Page (Profile Books, 2017)
 Write to the Point: A Master Class on the Fundamentals of Writing for Any Purpose (The Experiment, 2018) – US edition
 Our Times in Rhymes: A Prosodical Chronicle of Our Damnable Age, illus. Edith Pritchett (Square Peg, 2019),

References

External links
The Comment Awards 2018 > Shortlist, Popular Columnist of the Year
The Samuel Johnson Prize Judging Committee
Sam Leith, 2015 judge, at the Man Booker Prize (archived 2016-01-27)
 

1974 births
Living people
English male journalists
21st-century English novelists
English literary historians
Writers from London
People educated at Eton College
Alumni of Magdalen College, Oxford
English male novelists
21st-century English male writers